Larnite is a calcium silicate mineral with formula: . It is the calcium member of the olivine group of minerals.

It was first described from an occurrence at Scawt Hill, Larne, Northern Ireland in 1929 by Cecil Edgar Tilley and named for the location. At the type locality it occurs with wollastonite, spurrite,	perovskite,	merwinite,	melilite and
gehlenite. It occurs in contact metamorphosed limestones and chalks adjacent to basaltic intrusives.

Dicalcium silicate is chemically, β–, sometimes represented by the idealized oxide formula  also noted  in the cement chemist notation (CCN). When used in the cement industry, the mineral is usually referred to as belite.

References

Nesosilicates
Monoclinic minerals
Minerals in space group 14